Little America may refer to:

Arts and entertainment
 Little America (band), a group with Geffen Records
 Little America (film), a 1935 Paramount Pictures film
 Little America (TV series), an American anthology television series on Apple TV+
 Little America (video), a live concert DVD by Alphaville
 Little Amerricka, an amusement park in Marshall, Wisconsin, United States

Hotels and resorts
 Grand America Hotels & Resorts (formerly Little America)
 Little America Hotel (Salt Lake City), in Utah, United States
 Little America Hotel & Resort Cheyenne, in Wyoming, United States
 Little America Wyoming, near Green River, Wyoming, United States

Places
 Little America (exploration base), an Antarctic exploration base
 Little America, Illinois, an unincorporated community in Fulton County, Illinois, United States
 Little America, Wyoming, a census-designated place in Sweetwater County, Wyoming, United States
 "Little America", a nickname for Helmand Province

See also
 
 Little American